The Americas Zone was one of three zones of regional competition in the 2004 Fed Cup.

Group I
Venue: Porto Seguro, Bahia, Brazil (outdoor clay) 
Date: 19–24 April

The nine teams were divided into two pools of four and five teams. The teams that finished first in the pools played-off against those that placed second to determine which team would partake in the World Group Play-offs. The four nations coming last or second-to-last in the pools also played-off to determine which would be relegated to Group II for 2005.

Pools

Play-offs

  and  advanced to 2004 World Group Play-offs.

Group II
Venue: Porto Seguro, Bahia, Brazil (outdoor clay) 
Date: 19–24 April

The nine teams were divided into one pool of four and one pool of five teams. The top two teams of both pools play off to decide which nation is promoted to the Americas Zone Group I for 2005, while the rest played against each other to determine overall placings.

Pools

Play-offs

  and  advanced to Group I for 2005.

See also
Fed Cup structure

References

 Fed Cup Profile, Mexico
 Fed Cup Profile, El Salvador
 Fed Cup Profile, Colombia
 Fed Cup Profile, Puerto Rico
 Fed Cup Profile, Canada
 Fed Cup Profile, Brazil
 Fed Cup Profile, Cuba
 Fed Cup Profile, Chile
 Fed Cup Profile, Paraguay
 Fed Cup Profile, Jamaica
 Fed Cup Profile, Ecuador
 Fed Cup Profile, Bolivia
 Fed Cup Profile, Venezuela
 Fed Cup Profile, Dominican Republic

External links
 Fed Cup website

 
Americas
Sport in Porto Seguro
Tennis tournaments in Brazil